Ishmenevo (İşmän) is a rural locality (a village) in Karansky Selsoviet, Buzdyaksky District, Bashkortostan, Russia. The population was 53 as of 2010. There is 1 street.

Geography 
Ishmenevo is located 16 km north of Buzdyak (the district's administrative centre) by road. Bayrash is the nearest rural locality.

References 

Rural localities in Buzdyaksky District